Prazision LP is the debut studio album by American post-rock band Labradford. It was released in October 1993 by Kranky, serving as the label's first album release. It was re-released by Kranky on November 12, 2007, with an additional track taken from the band's first single.

Track listing

Personnel
Adapted from the Prazision LP liner notes.

Labradford
 Carter Brown – Memorymoog, Polymoog, Korg Polysix, Roland Vocoder Plus, Moog Taurus II bass pedals
 Mark Nelson – vocals, Ovation Preacher twelve-string guitar, Yamaha six-string, Epiphone Genesis, tape

Production and additional personnel
 Rob Christiansen – recording (1–11)
 Shawn Collins – recording (12)

Release history

References

External links
 

1993 debut albums
Labradford albums
Kranky albums
Flying Nun Records albums